The Saturn Award for Best Supporting Actress on Television is presented annually by the Academy of Science Fiction, Fantasy and Horror Films, honoring the work of actresses in science fiction, fantasy, and horror fiction on television.

The Walking Dead holds the record for the most wins in the category with six (from 18 total nominations), with four different actresses receiving the award, including Danai Gurira and Melissa McBride, the only people to have won the award twice. Laurie Holden was the first actress from the series to receive the award, and Lauren Cohan currently holds the network/cable version of the award. Emily Kinney and Tovah Feldshuh also received nominations.

As of the 47th Saturn Awards in 2022, the award is known as Best Supporting Actress in a Network or Cable Television Series and features a sister category: Saturn Award for Best Supporting Actress in a Streaming Television Series.

(NOTE: Year refers to year of eligibility, the actual ceremonies are held the following year.).

The winners are listed in bold.

Winners and nominees

1990s

2000s

2010s

2020s

Multiple nominations
8 nominations
 Melissa McBride

7 nominations
 Jennifer Carpenter

5 nominations
 Elizabeth Mitchell
 Amanda Tapping

4 nominations
 Danai Gurira
 Hayden Panettiere

3 nominations
 Amy Acker
 Jolene Blalock
 Alyson Hannigan
 Candice Patton
 Beth Riesgraf
 Katee Sackhoff
 Sophie Skelton
 Michelle Trachtenberg

2 nominations
 Morena Baccarin
 Kathy Bates
 Gina Bellman
 Charisma Carpenter
 Sarah Carter
 Gwendoline Christie
 Erica Durance
 Dakota Fanning
 Summer Glau
 Lena Headey
 Laurie Holden
 Allison Mack
 Danielle Panabaker
 Adina Porter
 Jeri Ryan
 Rhea Seehorn

Multiple wins
2 awards
 Melissa McBride (consecutive)
 Danai Gurira

See also
 Saturn Award for Best Supporting Actress in Streaming Presentation

External links
 Official site
 26th, 27th, 28th, 29th, 30th, 31st, 32nd, 33rd, 34th, 35th, 36th, 37th, 38th, 39th, 40th, 41st, 42nd

Supporting Actress on Television
Television awards for Best Supporting Actress